NNC 63-0532 is a nociceptoid drug used in scientific research. It acts as a potent and selective agonist for the nociceptin receptor, also known as the ORL-1 (opiate receptor-like 1) receptor.

The function of this receptor is still poorly understood, but it is thought to have roles in many disorders such as pain, drug addiction, development of tolerance to opioid drugs, and psychological disorders such as anxiety and depression. Research into the function of this receptor is an important focus of current pharmaceutical development, and selective agents such as NNC 63-0532 are essential for this work.

References 

Opioids
1-Naphthyl compounds
Piperidines
Methyl esters
Spiro compounds
Imidazolidinones
Nociceptin receptor agonists